M25 is a Ukrainian international highway (M-highway) connecting the western village of Solomonovo near Chop to the southern village of Yanoshi. The route stretches along the border with Hungary and Tisa River.

Route
The route starts at the highway interchange located between village of Solomonove and Chop train station. To the west through Solomonove a local street continues on to the Slovakian city of Cierna nad Tisou.

See also

 Roads in Ukraine
 Ukraine Highways
 International E-road network
 Hungary-Ukraine border

References

External links
 International Roads in Ukraine in Russian
 European Roads in Russian

Roads in Zakarpattia Oblast